Arnt Førland (born 1964) is a Norwegian motorcycle speedway rider who rode in 2004 Speedway Grand Prix of Norway.

Speedway Grand Prix results

References

See also 
 Norway national speedway team
 List of Speedway Grand Prix riders

1964 births
Living people
Norwegian speedway riders